La Tzoumaz (formally known as Les Mayens-de-Riddes) is a ski resort in the Swiss Alps, in the canton of Valais. It is part of the "Four Valleys" ski area, which consists of various ski resorts, including Verbier, Nendaz, Veysonnaz, La Tzoumaz, and Thyon. As such it has direct access to over 400 km of runs. Named after the word "tzoumer", meaning taking a break, La Tzoumaz nestles against the same mountain as Verbier, Mont Savolyres, and is at the same altitude (1500m). However, unlike Verbier, it is situated on north-facing slopes and hence enjoys a longer ski-season, lasting from early December all the way through to late-April. The resort has splendid views over the Rhone valley from the side of a small sunny valley on the north side of Verbier.

Quieter than Verbier, it is a resort popular with families, having a small ski lift for children, a natural ice rink, a heated swimming pool and the longest sledge run in Western Switzerland (at 10 kilometres). The resort has a population of just over 300 and is popular with British, German and Dutch visitors as well as Swiss nationals.

Geography
La Tzoumaz is located in a green valley above the Rhône, in the canton of Valais and has one main access road, which starts in the town of Riddes, 13 kilometres away (and at exit 24 of the Martigny motorway). La Tzoumaz is also at a base station of the Savolyres Cable Car, an 8-minute ride up and 11-minute ride down to Verbier.

Coordinates: .

Resort in winter
The resort has 1 brand new 8-seat cable car, 5 chair lifts, 5 drag lifts and 1 children's ski lift. There are 12 ski runs with a total length 28 km (30% easy, 60% intermediate, 10% difficult), a snowboard piste, a natural ice rink and the Western Switzerland's longest tobbogan run (10 km long and a drop of 848m) which starts at the summit of the station (2,354m).

The resort is also directly linked to the Four Valleys ski area, with 98 more ski lifts and a total of 400 km of ski runs. The [Verbier] zone of the Four Valleys is renowned for its off-piste opportunities. In particular Tortin, Mont Fort, Valon D'Arby and Creblet are popular excursions.

Resort in summer
The village offers 1 outdoor tennis court, fishing, paragliding, mountain biking and climbing. It is situated on the Bisse du Saxon (part of a 19th-century irrigation system that offers 100 km of gently inclined paths suitable for walking and mountain biking). Within a short drive of the resort are many family, cultural and historical attractions including Lake Geneva, the Grande Dixence dam, the medieval town of Sion, Aqua park, Thermal Baths and underground salt mines.

The Verbier-La Tzoumaz Bikepark had 5 separate downhill tracks each with at least 700m of altitude drop.

The "maison de la Forêt" has exhibitions of local wildlife and a popular cafe serving local produce. It’s also the beginning of the trail of the senses.

The trail of the senses allows you to discover nature through sight, touch, hearing, smell and taste.

Hikers can also discover the "bisses" and notably the bisse of Saxon. The small water channels have run through Valais since the Middle Ages bringing water from high in the mountains to the pastures below.

Accommodation

As well as having 6 small guesthouses and hotels, there are 155 privately owned apartments and chalets.

References

External links
La Tzoumaz’s Official site

Ski areas and resorts in Switzerland
Geography of Valais
Villages in Valais
Villages in Switzerland
Tourist attractions in Valais